Lesteva is a genus of ocellate rove beetles in the family Staphylinidae. There are at least 60 described species in Lesteva.

Species
These 69 species belong to the genus Lesteva:

 Lesteva albanica Bernhauer, 1936 g
 Lesteva angusticollis Mannerheim, 1830 g
 Lesteva aterrima Lohse, 1967 g
 Lesteva aureomontis Rougemont, 2000 c g
 Lesteva balearica Lohse, 1967 g
 Lesteva barguzinica Shavrin, Shilenkov & Anistschenko g
 Lesteva bavarica Lohse, 1956 g
 Lesteva benicki Lohse, 1958 g
 Lesteva brathinoides Zerche, 2000 g
 Lesteva breiti Lohse, 1956 g
 Lesteva brondeeli Lohse & Steel, 1961 g
 Lesteva cazorlana Lohse, 1987 g
 Lesteva chujoi Watanabe, 2005 g
 Lesteva coiffaiti Jarrige, 1963 g
 Lesteva cooteri Rougemont, 2000 c g
 Lesteva corsica Perris, 1869 g
 Lesteva curvipes Mulsant & Rey, 1880 g
 Lesteva dabanensis Shavrin, Shilenkov & Anistschenko g
 Lesteva dabashanensis Rougemont, 2000 c g
 Lesteva davidiana Rougemont, 2000 c g
 Lesteva dubia Lacordaire, 1835 g
 Lesteva elegantula Rougemont, 2000 c g
 Lesteva fageli Lohse, 1960 g
 Lesteva flavopunctata Rougemont, 2000 c g
 Lesteva fontinalis Kiesenwetter, 1850 g
 Lesteva foveolata Luze, 1903 g
 Lesteva graeca Scheerpeltz, 1931 g
 Lesteva hanseni Lohse, 1953 g
 Lesteva huabeiensis Rougemont, 2000 c g
 Lesteva ihsseni Lohse, 1956 g
 Lesteva jaechi Shavrin, 2017 g
 Lesteva kargilensis Cameron,1934 c g
 Lesteva kirbii Stephens, 1834 g
 Lesteva latipes Lohse & Steel, 1961 g
 Lesteva lepontia Baudi, 1870 g
 Lesteva lewisi Cameron,1930 c g
 Lesteva longicornis Bernhauer, 1929 g
 Lesteva longoelytrata (Goeze, 1777) g
 Lesteva luctuosa Fauvel, 1871 g
 Lesteva lusitana Lohse, 1955 g
 Lesteva mariei Jarrige, 1963 g
 Lesteva mateui Jarrige, 1954 g
 Lesteva mollis Rougemont, 2000 c g
 Lesteva monticola Kiesenwetter, 1847 g
 Lesteva nitidicollis Lohse & Steel, 1961 g
 Lesteva nivalis Rougemont, 2000 c g
 Lesteva ochra Li et al., 2005 c g
 Lesteva omissa Mulsant & Rey, 1880 g
 Lesteva pallipes LeConte, 1863 g b
 Lesteva pourtoyi Jarrige, 1972 g
 Lesteva praeses Fauvel, 1900 g
 Lesteva pubescens Mannerheim, 1830 g
 Lesteva pulcherrima Rougemont, −2000 c g
 Lesteva punctata Erichson, 1839 g
 Lesteva punctulata Latreille, 1804 g
 Lesteva rufimarginata Rougemont, 2000 c g
 Lesteva rufopunctata Rougemont, 2000 c g
 Lesteva sajanensis Zerche, 2000 g
 Lesteva sbordonii Bordoni, 1973 g
 Lesteva schoenmanni Shavrin, 2017 g
 Lesteva septemmaculata Rougemont, 2000 c g
 Lesteva sicula Erichson, 1840 g
 Lesteva steeli Lohse, 1982 g
 Lesteva submaculata Rougemont, 2000 c g
 Lesteva szekessyi Lohse & Steel, 1961 g
 Lesteva taygetana Lohse, 1955 g
 Lesteva uhligi Zanetti, 1984 g
 Lesteva villardi Mulsant & Rey, 1880 g
 Lesteva yunnanicola Rougemont, 2000 c g

Data sources: i = ITIS, c = Catalogue of Life, g = GBIF, b = Bugguide.net

References

Further reading

 
 
 

Omaliinae